The thalamogeniculate artery is a branch of the posterior cerebral artery supplying medial and lateral geniculate nucleus and the pulvinar nuclei of the thalamus.

External links
 Thalamogeniculate artery at Drugs.com

Arteries